Saint Mary is a term for Mary, the mother of Jesus.

Saint Mary may also refer to:

People 
 Mary Magdalene, saint and disciple of Jesus
 Mary of Bethany, saint and disciple of Jesus, sister of Martha and Lazarus
 Salome (disciple), saint and follower of Jesus, counted as one of the Three Marys in Roman Catholic tradition
 Mary of Egypt (ca. 344 – ca. 421), patron saint of penitents
 Marina the Monk, also known as Mary of Alexandria (died 508 AD), saint often considered a female Desert Father
 Mary de Cervellione (c. 1230 – 1290), saint often invoked against shipwreck
 Mary Frances of the Five Wounds (1715–1791), saint and member of the Third Order of St. Francis
 Mary MacKillop or Saint Mary of the Cross (1842–1909), first Australian saint
 Mariam Baouardy, or Saint Mary of Jesus Crucified (1846-1878), Greek nun

Places

Australia 
 St Mary, Queensland, a locality in the Fraser Coast Region

France 
 Saint-Mary, a commune in the Charente department

United Kingdom 
 St Mary (Brecon electoral ward), Powys, Wales

United States 
 St. Mary, Kentucky
 St. Mary, Missouri
 Saint Mary, Nebraska
 St. Mary Township, Waseca County, Minnesota
 St. Mary, Montana

Other 
 Saint Mary, Jersey
 Saint Mary Parish (disambiguation)

Other uses 
 Saint Mary (film)

See also
 Sancta Maria (disambiguation)
 Santa Maria (disambiguation)
 Saint Marie (disambiguation)
 Sainte-Marie (disambiguation)
 St. Mary's (disambiguation)
 Mount St. Mary's (disambiguation)